Hye-rin, also spelled Hye-lin, is a Korean given name now used as a feminine name. Its meaning depends on the hanja used to write each syllable of the name. There are 16 hanja with the reading "hye" and 17 hanja with the reading "rin" on the South Korean government's official list of hanja which may be registered for use in given names. People with this name include:

Hyerin, Seon Buddhist master who built Gilsangsa, the predecessor of Songgwangsa
Kim Hye-rin (artist) (born 1962), South Korean manhwa artist
Han Hye-rin (born 1988), South Korean actress
Raina (singer) (born Oh Hye-rin, 1989), South Korean singer, member of girl group After School
Seo Hye-lin (born 1993), South Korean singer, member of girl group EXID
Kim Hae-lin (born 1995), South Korean figure skater

See also
List of Korean given names

References

Korean feminine given names